Halichoeres solorensis, the green wrasse, is a species of salt water wrasse found in the Western Pacific Ocean.

Size

References

solorensis
Taxa named by Pieter Bleeker
Fish described in 1853